The speckled casebearer moth (Coleophora elaeagnisella) is a moth of the family Coleophoridae. It is found in North America, from the Great Lakes northward, including Michigan and Ontario.

The larvae feed on the leaves of Elaeagnus, Hippophae and Shepherdia species. They create a pistol-shaped case.

References

elaeagnisella
Moths described in 1908
Moths of North America